Anthony Maher may refer to:

Anthony Maher (Gaelic footballer) (born 1987), Gaelic football player with Kerry
Anthony Maher (soccer) (born 1979), American soccer player
Tony Maher (born 1945), Irish hurler
Tony Maher (Gaelic footballer) (born 1969), former Gaelic football player from County Laois in Ireland